This article lists the Labour Party's election results from the 1922 United Kingdom general election to 1929, including by-elections.

All candidates were sponsored, in some cases by the Divisional Labour Party (noted as "Constituency").  During this period, full details of the sponsorship of candidates were not reported; where known, they are listed.

Summary of general election performance

Sponsorship of candidates

Details of the sponsorship of candidates by the Co-operative Party and ILP nominees in 1922, 1923 and 1924 were published by those organisations.  Other figures were not collected and are therefore not known with certainty, but estimates of the number of trade union-sponsored candidates come from James Parker's Trade unions and the political culture of the British Labour Party, 1931-1940.

Election results

1922 general election

Morel in Dundee and Tout in Oldham were elected by taking second place in a two-seat constituency.

By-elections, 1922–1923

1923 general election

By-elections, 1923–1924

1924 general election

By-elections, 1924–1929

References

Election results by party in the United Kingdom
Results 1922